Denys Barvinko (16 February 1994 – 10 September 2021) was a Ukrainian professional footballer who played as a left-back for FC Metalist Kharkiv in the Ukrainian Premier League.

Career 
Barvinko emerged from the FC Metalurh Zaporizhya and Metalist Kharkiv Youth School Systems. On 1 April 2012, he made his debut in the Ukrainian Premier League for Metalist in a 1–1 draw with Kryvbas Kryvyi Rih, in which he assisted the equalizing goal scored by Marlos. Despite initial success, Barvinko retired from playing at the age of just 20 due to recurring injuries, and took up a coaching role.

In September 2021, he was admitted into hospital with hyperglycemia. As his condition worsened, he slipped into coma and died on 10 September 2021.

References

External links
 
 

1994 births
2021 deaths
Footballers from Dnipro
Ukrainian footballers
Association football defenders
Ukraine youth international footballers
FC Metalist Kharkiv players
FC VPK-Ahro Shevchenkivka players
Ukrainian Premier League players